The Halley Lectures are a series of annual public lectures hosted by the University of Oxford, in memory of the astronomer Edmond Halley. Currently, some podcasts of the lectures can be found through the Oxford Physics Public Lectures   These lectures aim to promote public understanding and engagement with science, mathematics, and related fields, and to inspire new generations of researchers and students to pursue careers in these areas. They are often delivered May or June each year at the Sir Martin Wood Lecture Theatre of the Clarendon Laboratory

History 
The tradition of the Halley Lecture in the University of Oxford was founded by  Henry Wilde  for the 1910  return of Halley's comet. By Wilde's direction, it is to be given annually on a subject related to  astronomy or terrestrial magnetism. With time,University expanded their scope to interpret astronomy including astrophysics, and terrestrial magnetism to  include "and terrestrial magnetism to include “the physics of
the external and internal parts of the terrestrial globe”
geophysics.  
The first Halley lecture  Celestial ejectamenta. was delivered by Henry Wilde himself  on Tuesday, May 10, 1910.

Purpose 

The purpose of the Halley Lectures is to bring leading experts in various fields to the University of Oxford, where they can share their knowledge and insights with the public. The lectures aim to promote public understanding and engagement with science and mathematics, and to inspire new generations of researchers and students to pursue careers in these areas.

Format 

The Halley Lectures are open to the public and are typically well-attended by people of all ages and backgrounds. Each lecture lasts approximately one hour, and is followed by a Q&A session where the audience can ask questions and engage with the speaker.

Topics 

The topics covered in the Halley Lectures are diverse and reflect the wide range of disciplines within science and mathematics that illuminate astronomy, astrophysics, cosmology, cosmogenesis, exobiology, and earth science. Selection of lecturers is made based on timeliness of the topic, their expertise and contributions to their respective fields.

Chronology of Halley Lectures

References 

Lecture series at the University of Oxford